Achamangalam is a village in the Tirupattur taluk of Tirupattur district, Tamil Nadu, India.

References 

Villages in Krishnagiri district